Robert Coulter (1891 – 31 December 1945) was a New Zealand politician of the Labour Party.

Biography

Robert Coulter was reported to have been born in 1891 in Christchurch and went to Woodend Public School. However, a Robert Coulter gained a prize in Standard 2 at Woodend District School in 1894. Children at that time had to attend school from age 7 to 13. Possibly he showed early talent and/or was born before 1891. He had a brother, J J Coulter and a sister, who lived in Wellington, or Timaru. He never married.

After primary education he worked in farming, lived about two years in Wellington and moved to Auckland.

In 1904 Robert Coulter settled in Te Aroha, to be a grocer and auctioneer, and was a member of Te Aroha Borough Council from May 1916. In 1915 he defended not being a volunteer for the war, but in 1917 he was conscripted into the forces, though he was given exemptions twice. He went to camp in May 1917 with the 29th Reinforcement. They reached France in October 1917, but it seems Robert was back by March 1918 and, in October 1918, he was re-elected to the council, becoming Mayor in April 1921. He was also president of Te Aroha Chamber of Commerce and Te Aroha Aero Club and associated for a number of years with the Northern Athletic Union, Thames Harbour Board and Te Aroha Fire Board.

He stood for Tauranga in 1932, won Waikato in 1935, but, with rearrangement of boundaries, was defeated in Hauraki in 1938 by Lieutenant- Colonel J. M. Allen. during which time represented the Waikato electorate from 1935 to 1938, when he was defeated by National's Stan Goosman.

In 1941 he was defeated as Te Aroha Mayor by L. W. Mackie. He then moved his headquarters to Hamilton, as he was selected to stand in Raglan, in succession to Lee Martin, who was retiring due to ill health. The 1941 election was cancelled, so it was not until 1943 that he was elected for Raglan. He was MP for that electorate on 31 December 1945, when he died in Timaru, after a long illness. His funeral was in Wellington. He was succeeded by Hallyburton Johnstone of National in 1946. Robert Coulter was elected twice in rural electorates that usually returned Reform or National MPs.

Coulter Bridge, which carries SH26 over the Waihou River, in Te Aroha, was built in 1928 and named after Robert Coulter.

Notes

References

1891 births
1945 deaths
New Zealand Labour Party MPs
New Zealand MPs for North Island electorates
Members of the New Zealand House of Representatives
Unsuccessful candidates in the 1938 New Zealand general election
Unsuccessful candidates in the 1925 New Zealand general election
Candidates in the 1941 New Zealand general election
People from Christchurch